Amish Shah is an American doctor, politician and a Democratic member of the Arizona House of Representatives representing District 5 since January 9, 2023. He previously represented District 24 from 2019 to 2023. Shah defeated incumbent State Representative Ken Clark.

Shah was born in Chicago to immigrant parents from India. He received degrees from Northwestern University and the University of California, Berkeley and had his own medical practice prior to being elected to the state legislature. Progress Arizona has given Shah's scorecard a lifetime score of 83%.

Co-sponsorship of HB2802 
In 2022, Republican state representative Russell "Rusty" Bowers and Shah introduced a bill that would, among other things, regulate conversion therapy in the state of Arizona, making it illegal when conducted by medical practitioners. The bill includes exemptions for religious institutions, which would still be allowed to practice conversion therapy. The bill has drawn the approval of the Church of Jesus Christ of Latter-Day Saints, but has also drawn criticism from others who believe the religious exemption takes the bill "three steps backward."

Support for the expansion of legal immunity for religious organizations 
In 2021, Shah voted in favor of HB2648, a bill authored by Republican Ben Toma, which gives religious organizations exemptions from legal liabilities during public emergencies. The bill has been criticized by Secular Coalition for Arizona as "the single most dangerous piece of Christian nationalist legislation introduced at in years." The Arizona chapter of the ACLU similarly opposed the bill, calling it "dangerous and unnecessary." Some religious groups also opposed the legislation, saying it carried "harmful consequences for all Arizonans, even the proponents of the bill."

Candidacy in Arizona's 5th legislative district primary election 
After the 2022 redistricting in Arizona was completed, Shah's home district was changed from District 24 to District 5. Shah had previously announced plans to run in District 9 but changed his decision after consulting with his attorneys about the legality of running in a district he did not live in.

References

External links

Year of birth missing (living people)
Living people
Democratic Party members of the Arizona House of Representatives
21st-century American politicians
American politicians of Indian descent
Politicians from Chicago
Northwestern University alumni
University of California, Berkeley alumni